Verónica Merchant (born November 28, 1967 in Mexicali, Baja California, Mexico) is a Mexican actress who played the role of Mariana Romero Vargas in the Mexican telenovela Corazón salvaje.

Filmography
Perseguidos  (2016) TV Series ... Irene Molina
Atrapada (2018) TV Series ... Daniela Vargas
The Five Juanas  (2021) TV Series ... Susana Bravo
Mujer de Nadie   (2022) TV Series ... Pilar Riveira
Hasta Que Te Conocí  (2016) TV Series ... Esperanza Mcculley
 Así en el barrio como en el cielo (2014- 2015)... Aurora Ferrara
 Vivir a destiempo (2013)... Cristina de Delgado 
 Quererte Así (2012) .... Carmela Ramírez
Bicycletas, Las (2009) (announced) .... Emma
"Mi vida por ti" (2009) TV series
Navidad, S.A. (2008)
Spam (2008)
Enemigos íntimos (2008)
"Amor en custodia" .... Victoría
Complot (2005) .... Ana
Manos libres (2005) .... Ofelia
"Mirada de mujer: El regreso" (2003) TV series
"Agua y aceite" (2002) TV series .... Margarita
Corazones rotos (2001) .... Eva
"Amores querer con alevosía" (2001) TV series
"Tío Alberto, El" (2000) TV series .... Marcela
"Amor de mi vida, El" (1998) TV series .... Clarisa Villaseñor (unknown episodes)
Ciudad que se escapa (1998) .... Lola
"Luz en el camino, Una" (1998) TV series .... Marcela
Profundo carmesí (1996) .... Rebeca Sanpedro
"Luz Clarita" .... Soledad
"Lazos de amor" .... Virginia Altamirano
"Alondra" .... María Elisa (1 episode, 1995)
Desiertos mares (1995) .... Margarita
"Mujer, casos de la vida real" (1 episode, 1995)
Hasta morir (1994) .... Victoria
Maestra con Angel, Una (1994)
Tiempo cautivo (1994)
"Corazón salvaje (1993 TV series) .... Mariana Romero Vargas
Principio y fin (1993) .... Natalia
Ciudad de ciegos (1991) .... Chica del departamento
Tu hora esta marcada (1991)
Dora y yo (1987)

Awards and nominations

Premios TVyNovelas

References

External links

1963 births
Living people
Mexican child actresses
Mexican telenovela actresses
Mexican television actresses
Mexican film actresses
Actresses from Baja California
20th-century Mexican actresses
21st-century Mexican actresses
Mexican people of French descent
People from Mexicali